The Matterhorn Ultraks is an international skyrunning competition held for the first time in 1982. It runs every year in Zermatt (Switzerland) in August, race valid for the Skyrunner World Series till 2010.

Winners

See also 
 Skyrunner World Series

References

External links 
 Official web site
 Internationaler Matterhornlauf at ARRS

Skyrunning competitions
Skyrunner World Series
Zermatt
Athletics competitions in Switzerland